CrossGen Chronicles was an American comic book published by CrossGen Entertainment from June 2000 to July 2002. Each issue told a story from one of the different worlds in the Sigilverse, usually a historical narrative of some aspect.

Issue #1
Sigilverse:

A 48-page introduction issue that begins the narrative of the Sigilverse by introducing the First, who have gathered to discuss the sudden appearance of the universe's sigil-bearers, main characters in CrossGen's first wave of titles.

Issue #2
Scion

Tells the story of how Admiral Edvin ("the Peacemaker") of the Heron Dynasty and Admiral Alexi of the Raven Dynasty forged peace between the two Dynasties and initiated the Ritual of Combat on Tournament Isle.

Issue #3
Meridian

Tells the story of Sephie's parents. The Muse of Giatan also makes an appearance years before Sephie's birth. This story is included in Meridian: Going to Ground graphic novel along with issues 8 to 14 of that series.

Issue #4
Sigil

Tells the origin of Sam and Tchlusarud's feud. This story is included in Sigil: The Marked Man graphic novel along with issues 8 to 14 of that series.

Issue #5
Mystic

The real story on Animora and the Guild Masters.

Issue #6
The First

Tells the story of the Secundae births.

Issue #7
Negation

The history of Obregon Kaine.

Issue #8
Crux

The Story of Danik and Capricia's encounter with Amatus years before transition.

2000 comics debuts